Leonard White may refer to:

 Leonard White (politician) (1767–1849), United States representative from Massachusetts
 Leonard White (physician) (1856–1906), American physician
 Leonard White (producer) (1916–2016), British actor and producer
 Leonard White (basketball) (born 1971), American professional basketball player
 Leonard D. White (1891–1958), historian of public administration in the United States
 Leonard White III, Musician, bandleader, producer, professor

See also
Len White (disambiguation)
Leon White (disambiguation)